Jennifer Capriati was the defending champion, but lost in quarterfinals to Nathalie Dechy.

Elena Bovina won the title by defeating Nathalie Dechy 6–2, 2–6, 7–5 in the final. It was the 1st title in the season for Bovina and the 3rd title in her career.

Seeds
The first four seeds received a bye into the second round.

Draw

Finals

Top half

Bottom half

External links
 WTA main and qualifying draws

Pilot Pen Tennis
Connecticut Open (tennis)
2004 Pilot Pen Tennis